

History 

Saint-Ghislain Airfield  is a recreational airfield located in the Walloon municipality of Saint-Ghislain, province of Hainaut, Belgium.

Privately managed, the aerodrome is home to two active flight schools, and to other aeronautical oriented leisure activities, such as vintage aircraft restoration, skydiving or amateur aircraft building.

A modernization was completed in 1992, including hard-surfacing of the single runway.

References

External links 
 Saint-Ghislain Airport - WikiAirports
 Saint-Ghislain Airport - Pilotnav.com
 Saint-Ghislain Airport - Metar-taf.com

Airports in Hainaut (province)